WRXK-FM (96.1 MHz) is a commercial radio station with studios in Estero, Florida and licensed to Bonita Springs, Florida, broadcasting to the Fort Myers-Naples-Marco Island area. WRXK-FM airs a rock format branded as "96 K-Rock" under Program Director Chris DeLozier.

96 K-Rock began in 1986. They first aired mainstream rock then changed their music format to active rock. It mixes hard rock, metal and classic rock. 96 K-Rock airs The House of Hair hosted by Dee Snider, lead singer of Twisted Sister.

96 K-Rock also airs Miami Dolphins football.

On February 13, 2012, WRXK-FM changed their format to hot talk, branded as "96 K-Rock, Talk That Rocks", but returned to rock on June 17, 2013, in preparation for sister station 99X's flip to ESPN programming on June 20.

On July 9, 2018, Beasley Broadcast Group parted ways with Bubba the Love Sponge, whose morning show had aired on WRXK-FM. A new morning show based out of sister station WRIF in Detroit and syndicated to Boston and other markets, "Dave and Chuck the Freak", replaced his show.

References

External links
WRXK-FM official website

RXK-FM
Bonita Springs, Florida
RXK-FM
1979 establishments in Florida
Radio stations established in 1979